Football is the popular sport, both in terms of participants and spectators, in Bangkok.

Introduction
In Bangkok, Thai League has been gaining popularity. There are many football clubs based in Bangkok.

History 
Bangkok has several of Thailand's significant football clubs, and the city is home to many football clubs.

Especially, Thai Farmers Bank F.C. won Asian Club Championship twice in 1994 and 1995.

Also, Police Tero reached the 2002–03 AFC Champions League final.

Competitions 
Bangkok held King's Cup since 1968

Clubs 
The table below lists all Bangkok clubs.

Defunct Clubs 
The table below lists all defunct Bangkok clubs.

Honours 
 Thailand Football Champions (9)
 Police Tero (2)
 Royal Thai Air Force (2), 
 Krung Thai Bank (2)
 Bangkok Bank (1)
 Bangkok United (1)
 Sinthana (1)

Bangkok derby 
There are many derbies between Football clubs based on Bangkok.

Stadiums 
 National Stadium (Supachalasai Stadium)
 Rajamangala National Stadium

See also
Football in Thailand

References

External links 
 Bangkok Soccer League